

2016 / 2017 ANDRA Championship Drag Racing Calendar 

*calendar subject to change

Results

See also

Motorsport in Australia
List of Australian motor racing series

References

External links

Drag racing events
2016 in Australian motorsport
2017 in Australian motorsport